Carlee Turner (born October 23, 1997) is an American ice hockey player who currently plays for the Boston Pride in the National Women's Hockey League.

Career 
As a junior player, Turner played 86 games for the North American Hockey Academy Winter Hawks of the Junior Women's Hockey League. She scored 48 of her 75 career points in her senior season when she served as team captain.

Across 139 NCAA games at the University of New Hampshire, she scored 73 points. As a senior she served as team captain of the UNH Wildcats, leading the team in faceoff win percentage (60.8%) and power play goals (5).  Turner often centered Meghara McManus and Taylor Wenczkowski who will be reuniting with her as familiar faces who also signed with the Boston Pride for the 2021 season. She displayed in interest in film study and statistics of hockey during her time at UNH.

Turner signed a one-year deal as a free agent with the Boston Pride on June 12, 2020.

Personal life 
Turner majored in medical and veterinary sciences at the University of New Hampshire.
She currently works as a medical assistant in Boston.

Career stats

Source

Honors 
2019-20 Sue Merz Award (7th Player) for the UNH Wildcats team
2019-20 One of three Wildcats players to earn the Dr. Allison Edgar Academic Award for Excellence
2016-17 Hockey East All Academic Team
2015-16 Named the JWHL Player of the Year
Source

References

External links
 
 

1997 births
Living people
American women's ice hockey forwards
Boston Pride players
New Hampshire Wildcats women's ice hockey players
University of New Hampshire alumni
Ice hockey people from Scottsdale, Arizona
Premier Hockey Federation players